Santoshpur is may refer to:

Santoshpur, Kolkata, a locality near Jadavpur, in Kolkata (Calcutta)
Santoshpur, Uluberia, a census town under Uluberia police station in Howrah district
Santoshpur, North 24 Parganas, North 24 Parganas district, West Bengal
Santoshpur, Maheshtala, South 24 Parganas, West Bengal
Santoshpur railway station